Cholo may refer to:

Cultures
 Cholo, a term referring to Amerindians or Mexican Americans
 Cholo (subculture), Chicano and Latino subculture
 Cholo languages, of Colombia and Panama

People
 El Cholo (wrestler) (born 1973), Mexican wrestler
 Cholo Laurel (born 1961), Filipino filmmaker
 Carmelo Simeone (1934–2014), Argentine footballer, called Cholo
 Diego Simeone (born 1970), nicknamed "El Cholo", Argentine football manager and former player
 Cholo Espada (born 1948), Puerto Rican boxer

Other uses
 Cholo, a character from George A. Romero's film Land of the Dead portrayed by John Leguizamo
 Cholo (film), a 1972 Peruvian film
 Cholo (video game)
 El Cholo Spanish Cafe
 Cholo alethe (Pseudalethe choloensis), a subtropical bird